Kamakazi (born Jamie Hildebrandt on 3 August 1981) is an Australian BMX cyclist who was selected to compete at the 2008 Summer Olympics in Beijing.

Kamakazi currently works as a boilermaker in addition to being a BMX cyclist.

References

External links
 
 
 

1981 births
Living people
BMX riders
Australian male cyclists
Olympic cyclists of Australia
Cyclists at the 2008 Summer Olympics
Cyclists from Brisbane